Shumilina District is a second-level administrative subdivision (raion) of Belarus in the Vitebsk Region. Its administrative seat is the urban-type settlement of Shumilina. The other urban-type settlement within the raion is Obal.

References

Districts of Vitebsk Region